Wink-Loving Independent School District is a public school district based in Wink, Texas, United States in Winkler County, Texas.  The district serves students in southern and western Winkler County along with all of Loving County.

Wink-Loving ISD was established in 1928 and in the following year built a two story Jr/High School with a mission revival styling designed by the Butler Company of Lubbock, Tx. In 1948 WLISD build a Band Hall and Cafeteria(now administration building). In 1959 they build a Elementary School. In 1962 WLISD build a gym and pool building. In 1978 WLISD extended the Elementary School. In 1981 expanded the gym adding a physical fitness center then 1982 built a new cafeteria and remodeled the old 1948 cafeteria turning into the administration building.                                                                
                                                                                                                                             In 2018, the school district was rated "failing" by the Texas Education Agency. The same Agency had rated the school district "academically acceptable" in 2009.

In November 2018, Superintendent of Schools Scotty Carman and the Wink ISD school board voted 6-1 in favor of demolishing the historic, but decrepit 90-year-old high school building, auditorium addition, which was demolished along with the old high school building, to make room for future development. Demolition began in January, 2019.

In 2020, the school district voted to replace the 1959 Elementary School, 1948 Band Hall, 1948 Administration Building, and the 1982 cafeteria. In August 2021, the new band hall was opened.
The new Elementary School and Cafeteria opened to the 2022-2023 school year. The old Elementary is planned to be demoed after the asbestos is removed and a new admin building and auditorium will be built on the grounds.

Schools
Located in western Winkler County, the district has two campuses, both in Wink.

Wink High School (Grades 7-12) and 
Wink Elementary (Grades PK-6).

References

External links
 

School districts in Winkler County, Texas
School districts in Loving County, Texas